Lewis Smith is the name of:

 Lewis Smith (baseball) (1858–?), American baseball player in one game, 1882
 Lewis Smith (politician) (1880–1950), Canadian politician
Lewis Smith (artist) (1907-1998), Outsider art artist
 Lewis Smith (cricketer) (1913–1978), English cricketer
 Lewis Smith (actor) (born 1956), American actor
 Lewis Smith (footballer) (born 2000), Scottish footballer
 Lewis A. Smith, American polo player
 Bull Smith (Lewis Oscar Smith, 1880–1928), baseball player

See also

Louis Smith (disambiguation)